This is a list of awards and nominations received by American actor, director, cinema film producer, dancer, and singer John Travolta.

Major associations

Academy Awards

BAFTA Awards

Golden Globe Awards

Primetime Emmy Award

Screen Actors Guild Awards

Other awards and nominations

American Comedy Awards

Academy of Science Fiction, Fantasy and Horror Films

Blockbuster Entertainment Awards

Chicago Film Critics Association

Critics' Choice Movie Awards

Critics' Choice Television Awards

Dallas–Fort Worth Film Critics Association

David di Donatello Award

Golden Raspberry Awards

Grammy Awards

Hollywood Film Festival

London Critics Circle

International Indian Film Academy Awards

Los Angeles Film Critics Association

MTV Movie Awards

National Board of Review

National Society of Film Critics

New York Film Critics Circle

Palm Springs International Film Festival

Satellite Awards

Saturn Awards

Southeastern Film Critics Association

Stockholm International Film Festival

TV Land Award

Golden Eye Award (Zurich Film Festival)

Notes

References

External links
 

Awards
Travolta, John